Means End was a Swedish progressive metal band from Stockholm whose sound is spearheaded by SATB choirs, operatic vocals, eight-string guitars, and jazz-fusion compositions. Their music is likened to an amalgamation of artists such as Eric Whitacre, Devin Townsend, Meshuggah, and Yellowjackets. They are notable for bridging the gap between classical composition and contemporary instrumentalism.

History
Means End was formed in late 2011 by bassist Rasmus Hemse and drummer Christian Schreil (previous member of Uneven Structure). They were later joined by acclaimed vocalist and Microsoft guru Robert Luciani (previous member of Vildhjarta) and fusion guitarist Leonard Eastgrove. Within a couple of months, Means End released an extended play with three songs to present their particular style and began composing a full-length album.

In 2012, the band earned endorsements with Toontrack, Fractal Audio, Lundgren Pickups, Microsoft, and partnered with Grammy Winning composer Eric Whitacre to remake his choir composition “Nox Aurumque” into a linear tempo metal song. Means End also performed at Vol.8 of the renowned Euroblast Festival with excellent feedback and an appreciated performance. After a year of focused composition and collaboration, Means End self-released their 12- debut album, The Didact. The album would earn Means End their first record deal.

In 2013, Means End signed a publishing and distribution deal with Rogue Records America for their next album, as well as for the re-release of their debut album The Didact in physical and digital formats. Means End said this in reaction to their new relationship with Rogue, “Of all the reputable companies we’ve approached, Rogue is the only one not afraid to  their chin out. They bet on up-and-coming bands, invent modern and clever distribution and marketing strategies, work with alternative media channels like video-game publishers, and lots of other things that the ageing plus-size labels simply can’t match. More importantly though, our strategic partnership with Rogue will result in more and better music than ever before. We’re looking forward to drawing on all of Rogue’s creative talent.” The band began writing material for their next album set to be released sometime in 2015. On April 29, 2014 a new guitarist, Andreas Grimell, was introduced in an instrumental, dual-guitar, playthrough of their song Omega Barrier.

The band announced their disbandment on March 8, 2015. "Thank you to everyone that has supported Means End since its inception. Our current constellation has come to an end.  As band-members we shared a common interest in taking progressive metal into uncharted compositional directions. This bond produced The Didact and many good memories, but the nature of "being progressive" tore at our seams. Driven by an aspiration to progress, change, and innovate, the scope of our musical endeavor outgrew us. As a band, we were not able to balance a project of such ambition with work, studies, family, children and other responsibilities.
We have an uncommonly diverse fan-base to which we owe a lot. Many of you have taken a personal stake in actively supporting Means End and spreading the word. Rest assured that we will, as individuals, continue to build on this foundation and continue to compose new great music."

Musical Style and Lyrical Themes

Musical Style and Genre Traits
Means End's musical style would be commonly classified as progressive metal or fusion. Unique components include heavy use of non-diatonic key-changes, polyphonic counterpoint, chromatic scales, and true polyrhythm. The guitar style uses a guitar tone popularly known as djent, popularized by extreme metal band Meshuggah. Full SATB choirs are used in the foreground of their music rather than as an atmospheric pad. Vocals are dynamic, ranging from low death metal growls to soaring operatic vocals. Walking-bass lines are influenced by jazz fusion.

Lyrical Themes
Means End's lyrics touch on many philosophical topics. The lyrics consists of philosophical themes such as  ontology, epistemology, history of ideas, metaphysics, mathematics, and other things that interest them. More specifically, a song called Omega Barrier is related to computer science, but also crosses the barrier to both philosophy and mathematics. An example from Omega Barrier is:

"This fits well with the observation that we simply can’t force ourselves to describe the neural or even symbolic functions from whence something like ambition emerges from; it’s just there. We could very well just be machines underneath it all and never be the wiser."

Many of their other songs feature complex, open-ended, lyrics, just as Omega Barrier does.

Studio Recording Equipment
Robert Luciani uses Neumann and Shure Microphones into a TwinFinity tube preamp to record vocals. Rasmus Hemsel uses a tube-preamp to record on his bass which as a custom made Lundgren pickup. Leonard Östlund uses a 30" 8-string VP Guitar with a custom made Lundgren pickup. An -Fx II, an all-in-one preamp and effects processor, is used on both of Rasmus and Leonard's equipment to boost sound quality.
Drums are programmed with -samples used in ToonTrack's Metal Foundry.

Discography
Extended Plays
EP (2011) (re-release 2012)
Studio Albums
The Didact (2013)

Members
 Final line-up
Robert Luciani –  vocals  
Rasmus Hemse –  bass 
Christian Schreil –  drums  
Leonard Eastgrove –  guitar 
Andreas Grimell –  guitar 
 Former
Henrik Gennert –  guitar

References

"MEANS END Signs With ROGUE RECORDS." Blabbermouthnet. Blabbermouth, 7 Aug. 2013. Web. 26 Sept. 2014.
"The Core Of Brutality: Means End Interview And Bio." The Core Of Brutality. Core Brutality, 13 May 2013. Web. 26 Sept. 2014.

External links
 Means End Official Facebook Page

Swedish progressive metal musical groups